Marigold, part of the Freudenberg Group, is the brand name of a range of rubber gloves it manufactures.

External links
 Marigold
 Freudenberg Group

References

Manufacturing companies established in 1947
1947 establishments in England
British subsidiaries of foreign companies